

Wise Wine (often referred to as Wise Wines) is an Australian winery at Eagle Bay, near Dunsborough, in the Margaret River wine region of Western Australia.

The winery was established in 1992, when Ron and Sandra Wise acquired the then Geographe Bay Estate (founded in 1983), and combined it with the nearby Eagle Bay Estate, which they had owned since 1986.

See also

 Australian wine
 List of wineries in Western Australia
 Western Australian wine

References

Notes

Bibliography

External links
official Wise Wine website

Wineries in Western Australia
Food and drink companies established in 1992
1992 establishments in Australia